Lyn Carpenter (born 1965) is an England Netball volunteer administrator and former National representative player. She is a former Chief Executive of Thurrock Council who was disgracefully forced to leave her position for her role in the local authority running up a debt of £1.5bn.

Netball career
Carpenter was the oldest player ever to be awarded a debut international cap in the England national netball team, which she received in December 1997 at the age of 32. During her senior international career she amassed 33 international caps, representing England and winning a bronze medal, at the 1998 Commonwealth Games in Kuala Lumpur, Malaysia. She also won a bronze medal at the 1999 Netball World Championships in New Zealand. She also represented Great Britain in basketball at the 1987 World Student Games in Zagreb.

Administration
Carpenter served on the Board of England Netball from 2003, latterly as Vice Chairman, until August 2014. She is a former current Chairman of Netball Europe a role she has held until 2019 before being elected as International Netball Federation regional director for Europe . In 2009, Carpenter was appointed to Hammersmith Council as Director of Residents Services. In September 2011 she was appointed to a new Biborough Executive Director role that also included the Royal Borough managing a range of complex universal services. Carpenter was appointed Chief Executive of Thurrock Council in September 2015. In September 2022 she was placed on gardening leave following an intervention by the government into the Council’s finances following the investment of council funds into solar farms and debt of £1.5 billion. The Essex council confirmed she would be paid about £50,000 despite not working out her notice.

References

https://www.bbc.com/news/uk-england-essex-64044276

Netball administrators
English netball players
Commonwealth Games bronze medallists for England
Netball players at the 1998 Commonwealth Games
Living people
Commonwealth Games medallists in netball
1965 births
AENA Super Cup players
1999 World Netball Championships players
Medallists at the 1998 Commonwealth Games